Alfonso González Martínez (born 4 May 1999), commonly known as Alfon, is a Spanish footballer who plays mainly as a left winger for Real Murcia, on loan from RC Celta de Vigo.

Club career
Alfon was born in Albacete, Castilla–La Mancha, and was an Albacete Balompié youth graduate. He made his senior debut with the reserves at the age of 17 on 21 August 2016, starting in a 0–1 Tercera División away loss against CD Atlético Tomelloso.

Alfon scored his first senior goal on 9 October 2016, netting the equalizer in a 1–3 home loss against CD Toledo B. He made his first team debut the following 14 May, replacing José Fran in a 0–0 home draw against Real Madrid Castilla in the Segunda División B championship.

On 29 August 2018, after spending the previous campaign exclusively with the B's, Alfon was loaned to Internacional de Madrid in the third division, for one year. Upon returning, he renewed his contract until 2022 on 12 July 2019, but still moved to Getafe CF B also in a temporary deal on 29 August.

On 21 August 2020, Alfon moved to another reserve team, Celta de Vigo B, also on a one-year loan deal. He made his first team debut the following 5 January, replacing Emre Mor in a 2–5 Copa del Rey away loss against UD Ibiza.

Alfon made his La Liga debut on 8 January 2021, replacing Fran Beltrán in a 0–4 home loss against Villarreal CF. In July, the club exercised his buyout clause.

On 27 June 2022, Alfon moved to Segunda División side Racing de Santander on loan for the season. His loan was cut short the following 30 January, and he moved to Real Murcia also in a temporary deal just hours later.

Career statistics

Club

References

External links

1999 births
Living people
Sportspeople from Albacete
Spanish footballers
Footballers from Castilla–La Mancha
Association football wingers
La Liga players
Primera Federación players
Segunda División B players
Tercera División players
Atlético Albacete players
Albacete Balompié players
Internacional de Madrid players
Getafe CF B players
Celta de Vigo B players
RC Celta de Vigo players
Racing de Santander players
Real Murcia players
Spain youth international footballers